Philippa of Catania, also known Philippa the Catanian or Filippa Catanese (died in 1345), was a Sicilian woman of low birth who became an influential figure in the royal court of the Kingdom of Naples.

Early life

Born in Catania, Philippa was a local fisherman's daughter. Boccaccio, who met her when she was already an elderly woman, noticed that she was "attractive in manner and appearance". She worked as a washerwoman when Robert, Duke of Calabriason of Charles II, King of Naplesinvaded Catania in 1328. His wife, Violante of Aragon, accompanied him to the military campaign. After discovering her pregnancy, Violante had to hire local staff and she chose Philippa as wet nurse for her son, Charles. Philippa was a diligent servant and Violante brought her back to Naples after her husband had been forced to withdraw his troops from Sicily.

Career and fall

Philippa was married off to Raymond de Campagne, a former slave of Ethiopian origin. Being Charles II's favorite and a successful military commander, Raymond had become one of the wealthiest landowners in the Kingdom of Naples.

Philippa and her granddaughter, Sancia de' Cabanni were accused of participating in the murder of Andrew, Duke of Calabria.

References

Sources

People from Catania
1345 deaths
People from Naples
14th-century Italian women
Court of Joanna I of Naples